Jim Stangeland (December 21, 1921 – October 25, 2014) was an American football player and coach.  He served as the head coach at California State University, Long Beach from 1969 to 1973, where he compiled a record of 31–24–2, including back-to-back Pacific Coast Athletic Association championships (1970–1971) and an appearance in the Pasadena Bowl in 1970.

Head coaching record

College

References

1921 births
2014 deaths
American football ends
Arizona State Sun Devils football players
Long Beach State 49ers football coaches
USC Trojans football coaches
USC Trojans football players
High school football coaches in Arizona
High school football coaches in California
Junior college football coaches in the United States
Sportspeople from Huntington Beach, California
Players of American football from Los Angeles
Sports coaches from Los Angeles